Akluj is a town on the banks of Nira in Solapur district, Maharashtra, India. Akluj was earlier known for its large trade in cotton, which has almost disappeared at present. It is on the bank of River Nira. The town and surrounding area is agriculturally rich. Former deputy chief minister of Maharashtra, Vijaysinh Mohite–Patil was the sarpanch of Akluj.

Historical background
Akluj is one of the biggest grampanchayat of Maharashtra. The name Akluj is believed to be derived from 'Shri Akalai Devi' which is Gramadevata of Akluj. It was built by Yadav king Raja Singhan in the 13th century. Evidence shows that, after Yadavas it was ruled by Mughals and Britishers. Aurangjeb's Subhedar for south named Bahaddurkhan appointed Shaikh Ali as a chief official of the Akluj fort in 1673 and Ranmastkhan was appointed as a chief Thanedar in 1675. Evidences also shows that in 1679 Dilerkhan and Chhatrpati Sambhaji Maharaj stayed in the fort of Akluj for 4 months. Bajirao Peshwa II was also stayed for three months in this fort, when he was dismissed from Peshwai by Britishers in 1802. When Maharaja Sambhaji was trapped by Mughals in 1689, Mughal Sardar traveled through Akluj. In 1792 Captain Moor, the author of the Hindu Pantheon, described it as " Akhloos, a large respectable town with a well supplied market and with a fort and several handsome buildings and wells ". In 1803 on his march from Srirangapatnam to Pune to reinstate Bajirao II, General Wellesley halted at Akluj from the 13 to 15 April. All these incident shows that from the medieval period, Akluj was important and famous as historical place.

Nowadays akluj is developed around its peripheral, there are many hospitals, small businesses grown. Farming and depending businesses are major source of income in this region. Akluj has good hotels, parks, shopping complexes and many things to spend your time.

Location
It is located on the right bank of Nira River. The latitude 17.9000 and longitude 75.0333. The altitude in feet 1581 Lat (DMS) north 17° 53' 60 N  Long (DMS) east 75° 1' 60E altitude (meters) 481.

Climate
The Akluj is a part of Deccan plateau so its area is flat. In general the climate of Akluj is suitable for farming and is characterized by three seasons namely summer, winter and rainy. The special characteristic of climate of the Akluj is dry except during the monsoon season. Month of May is generally hottest (up to ) month of the year. September has pleasant weather with average  temperature. The mean annual rainfall at Akluj is

Population

, the current population is approximately 40,000.

A common development plan is sanctioned for Akluj, Yashwantnagar, Sangramnagar, Malewadi, Chaundeswarwadi, Malinagar, Anandnagar, Bagewadi and Savatgavhan village cluster.

Nearby airports
Baramati Airport
Solapur Airport
Pune Airport (

Nearby railway stations
Pandharpur
Kurduwadi
Sangola
Baramati
Phaltan
Lonand
Daund
Solapur
Miraj
Pune

Politics
Akluj's political atmosphere has always revolved around one prominent family: Mohite-Patil. The late Shri. Shankarao Mohite Patil (Ex. MLA 1952–1972) started with social politics. After him Shri. Vijaysinh Shankarao Mohite Patil, led politics in Solapur district. Both worked on fundamental infrastructure and worked in transportation, sugar industry and irrigation sectors.

List of MLA's from Malshiras Constituency
1952 - Shankarrao Mohite-Patil, INC
1957 - Shankarrao Mohite-Patil, INC
1962 - Shankarrao Mohite-Patil, INC
1967 - Shankarrao Mohite-Patil, INC
1972 - Changojirao Deshmukh, INC
1978 - Shyamrao Patil, Janata Party
1980 - Vijaysinh Mohite-Patil, Independent
1985 - Vijaysinh Mohite-Patil, INC
1990 - Vijaysinh Mohite-Patil, INC
1995 - Vijaysinh Mohite-Patil, INC
1999 - Vijaysinh Mohite-Patil, NCP
2004 - Vijaysinh Mohite-Patil, NCP
2009 - Hanumant Dolas, NCP
2014 - Hanumant Dolas, NCP
2019 - Ram Satpute, BJP

Education
Akluj has almost all type of well known educational institutions. Which includes, Engineering, Pharmacy, Education (D.Ed. & BEd), Agri, I.T.I., English medium schools and also colleges of arts, science, Computer, Management, Nursing & commerce educations. Few of them are mentioned below
Shankarrao Mohite-Patil Mahavidhyalaya, Malevadi
Sadashivrao Mane Vidyalaya (SMV)
Green-Fingers English Medium School
Sahkar Maharshi Shankarrao Mohite-Patil Institute of Technology and Research (Engineering college)
Vijaysinh Mohite-Patil College of Nursing
Rajsinh Mohite-Patil Institute of Management Studies
Green-fingers College of Computer & Technology
Vijaysinh Mohite-Patil English Medium D.Ted College
Ratnai college of Agriculture
Shankarrao Mohite-Patil English Medium School
Maharshi Shankarrao Mohite-Patil Prashala
Akluj Night School
Shrimati Ratnaprabhadevi Mohite-Patil Home Science
College of Pharmacy (B. Pharmacy & D. Pharmacy)
Aklai Vidyalaya

Flora and fauna
Common birds seen
Sun bird - सुर्य पक्षी
Sparrow - चिमणी
Myna - साळूंखी
Laughing Dove - छोटा तपकिरी होला
Kite - घार
Brahminy kite - मोरंगी घार
Crow - कावळा
Cuckoo - कोकीळ
Red-wattled Lapwing -टिटवी
Green bee-eater - वेडा राघू
Red-vented bulbul - लालबुड्या बुलबुल
Brahminy Starling - भांगपाडी मैना
Kingfisher - खंड्या पक्षी / ढिवर
Parrots - पोपट
Greater coucal - भारद्वाज पक्षी
Jungle Babbler - जंगली सातभाई
Scaly-breasted Munia - ठिपकेवाली मनोली (मुनिया)
Oriental Magpie-Robin - दयाळ
Indian Robin - चीरक
Lesser Whitethroat Warbler -
Ashy Prinia - राखी वटवट्या
Common Tailorbird - शिंपी
Common Iora - सुभग
Long-tailed shrike - तांबूस पाठीचा खाटीक
Grey hornbill - धनेश
Egret - बगळा
White wagtail - धोबी

Villages and cities near Akluj
 Velapur
Malshiras
 Paniv
 Indapur
 Tembhurni
 Natepute
 Walchandnagar (

 Satara
 Sangli
 Kolhapur
 Mumbai 
 Panaji
 Hyderabad

References

Akluj
Cities and towns in Solapur district